The 2022 Hamburg European Open was a combined men's and women's tennis tournament played on outdoor clay courts. It was the 116th edition of the event for the men and the 20th edition for the women. The tournament was classified as a WTA 250 tournament on the 2022 WTA Tour and as an ATP Tour 500 series on the 2022 ATP Tour. The tournament took place at Am Rothenbaum in Hamburg, Germany between 17 and 24 July 2022.

Champions

Men's singles

  Lorenzo Musetti def.  Carlos Alcaraz, 6–4, 6–7(6–8), 6–4

Women's singles

  Bernarda Pera def.  Anett Kontaveit, 6–2, 6–4

This was Pera's second WTA title of the year and her career.

Men's doubles

  Lloyd Glasspool /  Harri Heliövaara def.  Rohan Bopanna /  Matwé Middelkoop, 6–2, 6–4

Women's doubles

  Sophie Chang /  Angela Kulikov def.  Miyu Kato /  Aldila Sutjiadi, 6–3, 4–6, [10–6]

Points and prize money

Points distribution

Prize money 

*per team

ATP singles main draw entrants

Seeds

 1 Rankings are as of 11 July 2022.

Other entrants
The following players received wildcards into the main draw:
  Nicola Kuhn
  Max Hans Rehberg
  Jan-Lennard Struff

The following players received entry from with a protected ranking:
  Aljaž Bedene
  Borna Ćorić

The following players received entry from the qualifying draw:
  Daniel Elahi Galán
  Jozef Kovalík
  Luca Nardi
  Marko Topo

The following player received entry as a lucky loser:
  Ričardas Berankis

Withdrawals
  Alexander Bublik → replaced by  Ričardas Berankis
  Márton Fucsovics → replaced by  Lorenzo Musetti
  Gaël Monfils → replaced by  Fabio Fognini
  Oscar Otte → replaced by  Federico Coria
  Jannik Sinner → replaced by  Daniel Altmaier

ATP doubles main draw entrants

Seeds

1 Rankings are as of 11 July 2022.

Other entrants
The following pairs received wildcards into the doubles main draw:
  Daniel Altmaier /  Jan-Lennard Struff
  Dustin Brown /  Tobias Kamke

The following pair received entry from the qualifying draw:
  Ivan Sabanov /  Matej Sabanov

The following pair received entry as lucky losers:
  Sander Arends /  David Pel

Withdrawals
  Ivan Dodig /  Austin Krajicek → replaced by  Nicolás Barrientos /  Miguel Ángel Reyes Varela
  Tallon Griekspoor /  Botic van de Zandschulp → replaced by  Sander Arends /  David Pel
  Nikola Mektić /  Mate Pavić → replaced by  Nikola Ćaćić /  Dušan Lajović

WTA singles main draw entrants

Seeds

 1 Rankings are as of 11 July 2022.

Other entrants
The following players received wildcards into the main draw:
  Anett Kontaveit
  Eva Lys
  Nastasja Schunk

The following players received entry from the qualifying draw:
  Alexandra Cadanțu-Ignatik
  María Carlé
  Nao Hibino
  Sabine Lisicki
  Oksana Selekhmeteva
  Joanne Züger

The following players received entry as lucky losers:
  Kateryna Baindl
  Suzan Lamens

Withdrawals
Before the tournament
  Danielle Collins → replaced by  Irina Bara
  Dalma Gálfi → replaced by  Suzan Lamens
  Anhelina Kalinina → replaced by  Bernarda Pera
  Marta Kostyuk → replaced by  Misaki Doi
  Elena Rybakina → replaced by  Laura Pigossi
  Clara Tauson → replaced by  Aleksandra Krunić
  Tamara Zidanšek → replaced by  Kateryna Baindl
  Zheng Qinwen → replaced by  Tamara Korpatsch

WTA doubles main draw entrants

Seeds

1 Rankings are as of 11 July 2022.

Other entrants
The following pairs received a wildcard into the doubles main draw:
  Anna Klasen /  Tamara Korpatsch
  Nastasja Schunk /  Ella Seidel

The following pair received entry as alternates:
  María Carlé /  Laura Pigossi

Withdrawals
  Aleksandra Krunić /  Katarzyna Piter → replaced by  María Carlé /  Laura Pigossi

References

External links
 Official website

2022 in German tennis
Hamburg European Open
Hamburg European Open
2022
July 2022 sports events in Germany
2020s in Hamburg